Carson Street may refer to:
Carson Street (Carson City, Nevada) or U.S. Route 395 Business
Carson Street (Los Angeles) or 217th Street, in Carson, California

Streets in the United States